Silas Câmara (born 15 December 1962), is a Brazilian politician and pastor. Although born in Acre, he has spent his political career representing Amazonas, having served as state representative since 1999 for various political parties.

Personal life
Câmara is a pastor and elder in the Assembleias de Deus church. Câmara has his own radio show and is married to  Antônia Lúcia, an economist and Pentecostal missionary. His wife often appears with him on his radio show and at his political event.

Political career
Câmara voted in favor of the impeachment against then-president Dilma Rousseff and political reformation. Câmara would later back Rousseff's successor Michel Temer against a similar impeachment motion.

References

1962 births
Living people
People from Rio Branco, Acre
Brazilian Democratic Movement politicians
Liberal Party (Brazil, 1985) politicians
Democrats (Brazil) politicians
Brazilian Labour Party (current) politicians
Social Christian Party (Brazil) politicians
Party of the Nation's Retirees politicians
Republicans (Brazil) politicians
Brazilian Assemblies of God pastors
Members of the Chamber of Deputies (Brazil) from Amazonas
Members of the Legislative Assembly of Amazonas